Hurricane Fox was the strongest and deadliest tropical cyclone of the below average 1952 Atlantic hurricane season. The seventh tropical storm, sixth Atlantic hurricane, and the third major hurricane of the season, Fox was a small and intense Caribbean storm that developed northwest of Cartagena, Colombia, in the southern Caribbean. It moved steadily northwest, intensifying to a tropical storm on October 21. The next day, it rapidly strengthened into a hurricane and turned north passing closely to Grand Cayman, Cayman Islands. It weakened over land, but it re-strengthened as it turned east over the Bahamas. On October 26, it weakened and took an erratic path, dissipating west-southwest of Bermuda on October 28.

Hurricane Fox was the second most intense hurricane to strike Cuba until Hurricane Michelle in the 2001 Atlantic hurricane season. It was originally believed to have been the second Category 4 hurricane in Cuba prior to the Atlantic hurricane reanalysis. At the time, the cyclone produced the fourth lowest pressure in a landfalling Cuban hurricane; only the 1917, 1924, and 1932 hurricanes were more intense. Hurricane Irma would later join that list in 2017. Hurricane Fox killed 600 people across the island, causing severe crop damages in rural areas. The hurricane also ruined 30 percent of the tomato crops on Eleuthera in the Bahamas. Total damages reached $10 million in Cuba. Fox was the second hurricane to land during the season, after Hurricane Able struck South Carolina.

Meteorological history

Fox is believed to have developed from a low-pressure area in the Intertropical Convergence Zone, though it was not operationally detected until October 21. The system steadily advanced northwest and it gradually intensified. At the time, the system is estimated to have strengthened to Tropical Storm Fox. The hurricane rapidly intensified and turned north on October 23, strengthening to attain winds which correspond to a modern-day major hurricane, a storm of Category 3 status or higher on the Saffir–Simpson scale. The Hurricane passed closely to Grand Cayman, Cayman Islands. Late on October 24, the cyclone struck the small island of Cayo Guano del Estes in the Archipelago de los Canarreos, south of Cienfuegos. The cyclone crossed the mainland coast of Cuba west of Cienfuegos, and it weakened as it crossed the island.

Early on October 25, Hurricane Fox entered the Atlantic Ocean. It crossed central Andros and turned east across the Bahamas. On October 26, the hurricane briefly re-intensified as it crossed Cat Island. The center became ill-defined, and the cyclone quickly weakened. It turned north and then took an erratic northeast turn as it weakened to a tropical storm on October 27. The system gained extratropical characteristics as it merged with a polar frontal boundary, and it dissipated west-southwest of Bermuda on October 28.

Preparations
Advisories, along with coordination between the National Observatory at Havana and U.S. Weather Bureau, were credited for the reduced deaths in Cuba. Weather observations were also readily available from Cuban meteorological stations. On October 25, the cyclone's hurricane-force winds were expected to remain off the Florida east coast, although gale-force winds were anticipated from the Florida Keys to Palm Beach, Florida. Accordingly, storm warnings were issued from Key West, Florida to Vero Beach, Florida. Military aircraft were transported to safer locations, while watercraft were stored in harbors and rivers. Hotels and resorts were boarded up on the barrier islands. The Bahamas received warnings well in advance of the hurricane. The hurricane turned quickly to the east, which reduced the threat to Bimini, Cat Cay, Grand Bahama, and the Abaco Islands.

Impact

An aircraft flight into the storm experienced severe turbulence, and wind driven rain reportedly stripped paint from the plane's surfaces.

As a result of the storm, 70 people were injured in Cuba. Severe damage to properties and crops occurred in rural areas. In Zulueta, 30 structures were destroyed, while a Japanese freighter was washed ashore on the reefs near Cayo Breton. The crew survived, though another ship was disabled during the storm. The fringes of the storm produced heavy rainfall in Cuba, flooding low areas and causing several rivers to overflow their banks. In Aguada de Pasajeros, 600 buildings were demolished, while 36 of 261 sugar mills across the island were damaged by Hurricane Fox. In all, Hurricane Fox killed 600 people in Cuba and caused $10 million in damages.

Crops were damaged by high winds and heavy precipitation on Eleuthera. About 30 percent of the tomato crops were destroyed during the storm. A man who attempted to secretly seed and weaken the storm was missing and presumed dead after his plane disappeared off Miami, Florida. Multiple searches by the Coast Guard were unsuccessful.

In the early 1950s, Atlantic tropical cyclones were named via the Joint Army/Navy Phonetic Alphabet. Hurricane Fox of 1952 was the final Atlantic tropical cyclone to be designated with this naming system, and a female list of tropical cyclone names was utilized in the 1953 Atlantic hurricane season. After the stronger 1917 Pinar del Río hurricane, Hurricane Fox was Cuba's second most intense landfall until Hurricane Michelle struck the island in 2001. Originally, the 1917 hurricane was believed to have been a Category 3 hurricane prior to the Atlantic hurricane reanalysis, which made Fox the second Category 4 landfall after the 1932 Cuba Hurricane. At the time, Fox was the fourth most intense hurricane to strike Cuba in terms of atmospheric pressure; only the 1917, 1924, and 1932 storms were stronger at one point in their life spans.

See also

List of Category 4 Atlantic hurricanes
List of Florida hurricanes
Hurricane Michelle
Hurricane Paloma

References

1952 Atlantic hurricane season
Category 4 Atlantic hurricanes
Hurricane Fox
Hurricane Fox
October 1952 events in North America